Rhamondre Stevenson (born February 23, 1998) is an American football running back for the New England Patriots of the National Football League (NFL). He played college football at Oklahoma, where he was a bowl game MVP, and was selected by the Patriots in the fourth round of the 2021 NFL Draft.

Early years
Stevenson attended Centennial High School in Las Vegas, Nevada. As a junior in 2015, he was the Las Vegas Sun High School Player of the Year.

College career
Stevenson played at Cerritos College for two seasons before transferring to the University of Oklahoma. In his first five collegiate games, Stevenson scored a rushing touchdown in each game. In his first season at Oklahoma in 2019, he played in the first 13 games of the season before being suspended for the 2019 Peach Bowl because of a failed drug test for marijuana. He finished the season with 515 yards on 64 carries with six touchdowns. Stevenson returned from the suspension six games into the 2020 season. In his first game back, he had three rushing touchdowns in a 62–28 victory over Texas Tech. He followed that up with 104 rushing yards and two rushing touchdowns to go along with 60 receiving yards in a 62–9 victory over Kansas. Two weeks later, against Oklahoma State, he had 195 scrimmage yards in the 41–13 victory. He was named the MVP of the 2020 Cotton Bowl after rushing for 186 yards and a touchdown on 18 carries.

Collegiate statistics

Professional career

Stevenson was drafted by the New England Patriots in the fourth round, 120th overall, of the 2021 NFL Draft. He signed his four-year rookie contract with New England on May 19, 2021.

2021 season
After being lightly used during the first eight games of the season, Stevenson had a breakout game in week 9 against the Carolina Panthers, with 106 all-purpose yards that included a 41-yard reception on a short out-pattern that set up a Patriots touchdown, before leaving the game with a concussion. The following week versus the Cleveland Browns, with regular starter Damien Harris inactive due to a concussion in the prior week, Stevenson was named the starter. He scored two touchdowns on 100 yards rushing, and added another 14 yards on receptions as New England won 45–7.  In Week 11 against the Atlanta Falcons on Thursday Night Football, Stevenson once again led the team in rushing, splitting carries with starter Damien Harris, and ending up with 69 yards on 12 carries in the 25–0 win.  He continued to serve as the team's #2 running back behind starter Harris, gaining 46 yards on nine carries in week 13 win against the Tennessee Titans and taking the bulk of the load in a run-heavy win over the Buffalo Bills in week 14, a game in which the Patriots only threw the ball three times, amassing 78 yards on 24 carries. He finished the season with 606 rushing yards and five touchdowns in 12 games and two starts.

2022 season
Stevenson had a breakout season in 2022, despite starting the season as the backup to Damien Harris. In Week 5 against the Detroit Lions, Stevenson rushed for 161 yards on 25 carries in a 29–0 win. The following week, in his first start of the season, he rushed for 76 yards and two touchdowns in a 38–15 win over the Cleveland Browns. In Week 15, he ran for a career-high 172 yards and a touchdown on 19 carries. He finished the season with 1,040 rushing yards and five touchdowns along with a team-leading 69 catches to go with 421 receiving yards and one touchdown.

NFL career statistics

Regular season

Postseason

References

External links

New England Patriots bio
Oklahoma Sooners bio

1998 births
Living people
Sportspeople from Las Vegas
Players of American football from Nevada
American football running backs
Oklahoma Sooners football players
African-American players of American football
Cerritos Falcons football players
New England Patriots players
21st-century African-American sportspeople